Pholidogaster ('scaly stomach') is an extinct genus of tetrapod that lived during the Middle Carboniferous period (late Viséan to early Serpukhovian). Pholidogaster is known from only two specimens found in Gilmerton, Scotland. Historically it was one of the first to show science the evolutionary link between fish and amphibians.

This animal had a very long and slender body, with small and feeble limbs. The shoulder structure is further back than is usual. Belly scales are present (hence its name), suggesting that in life it did not just swim, but scrawled over hard surfaces as well. The structure of the jaw is not clear, since the jaw bones on both specimens are not well preserved. However, there are large fangs in the front of the mouth, presumably used in hunting. It was a small to medium-sized animal around 1 m in length.

References

External links
 Pholidogaster at Palaeos

Basal tetrapods of Europe
Prehistoric tetrapod genera
Carboniferous tetrapods
Taxa named by Thomas Henry Huxley
Fossil taxa described in 1862